Chryseobacterium anthropi  is a Gram-negative bacteria from the genus of Chryseobacterium.

References

Further reading

External links
Type strain of Chryseobacterium anthropi at BacDive -  the Bacterial Diversity Metadatabase

anthropi
Bacteria described in 2009